Dahlgren is a village in Hamilton County, Illinois, United States. The population was 525 at the 2010 census. It is part of the Mount Vernon Micropolitan Statistical Area.

Geography
Illinois Route 142 passes through the village, leading southeast  to McLeansboro, the county seat, and northwest  to Mount Vernon.

History 

The area around present-day Dahlgren was known in the 1860s as the Shelton Precinct in Hamilton County before townships were formally established. In 1869 surveyors for the St. Louis & South-Eastern Rail Road (predecessor to the Louisville and Nashville Railroad) referred to the future town site as "Little Prairie." Construction of the railroad commenced in 1870 and was completed through the area in late 1871. At that time railroad officials applied to establish a post office in the nascent town which was to be home to the local railroad section boss. After the name "Cottonwood" was rejected by the U. S. postmaster (having already been used in Illinois) the name "Dahlgren" was assigned and the post office commenced operation on December 11, 1871. The village was named for John A. Dahlgren (1809–1870), a U.S. naval officer prominent during the American Civil War. On March 29, 1872, the official founding date of the village, A. M. Sturman executed a Deed of Dedication whereby he ceded 1 square mile of land centered on present day Main and 3rd Streets to formally layout the town. All land titles in Dahlgren derive from this original Deed of Dedication which was itself based on the original surveys conducted pursuant to Northwest Ordinance of 1787.  The original settlement of Dahlgren extended roughly from the railroad depot/Chestnut St. (originally "A" Street) south to Sturmman St (originally "D" Street) and from 1st St. west to 5th St., a total of 12 square blocks.

Demographics

As of the census of 2010, there were 525 people, 211 households, and 140 families residing in the village. There are 31 unoccupied units. The racial makeup of the village was 96% White, 2.5% Black, and 1.5% Hispanic or Latino.

There were 211 households, out of which 30.9% had children under the age of 18 living with them, 52.6% were married couples living together, 30.33% were a single-person households, and 23.5% had someone living alone who was 65 years of age or older. The average household size was 2.49 and the average family size was 3.08.

In the village, the population was spread out, with 20.5% under the age of 15, 11.24% from 15 to 24, 23.24% from 25 to 44, 28.57% from 45 to 64, and 16.57% who were 65 years of age or older. The median age was 39.3 years. For every 100 females, there were 91.6 males. There were 435 persons age 15 or older.

The median income for a household in the village was $32,734, and the median income for a family was $34,886. Males had a median income of $35,313 versus $21,071 for females. The per capita income for the village was $16,944. About 8.39% of families and 15.29% of the population were below the poverty line, including 12.3% of those under age 18 and 26.2% of those age 65 or over.

Commerce and transportation 

Agriculture remains the primary economic activity in the vicinity of Dahlgren. Other business activity includes retail sales and manufacturing, including the fabrication of custom cabinetry and countertops.

Dahlgren is located on Illinois Route 142 (formerly U.S. Route 460). The Evansville Western Railway (EVWR) (formerly CSX Transportation) provides freight rail service to Dahlgren. CSX divested  of rail line (from Howell Yard in Evansville, Indiana, to Okawville, Illinois) to the Paducah and Louisville Railway (PAL), an operating entity of Four Rivers Transportation, Inc. This was a transaction whereby CSX sold all track, ties and track equipment to PAL and provided a 20-year lease on the right-of-way. Upon completion of the sale on 31 December 2005, PAL transferred all interests to the new Class III operating entity/subsidiary, EVWR, which began operating on 1 January 2006. CSX (formerly the Louisville & Nashville R.R.) retains title to all real estate on which the railroad is situated.

Dahlgren has no passenger services. The nearest airports providing service are Marion Williamson County Regional Airport (MWA), Evansville Dress Regional Airport (EVV) and Lambert-Saint Louis International Airport (STL). The nearest passenger rail connection (Amtrak) is in Centralia, Illinois. Interstate bus service is available in Mount Vernon, Illinois,  to the northwest.

Media and communication 

The Dahlgren post office provides service to more than 1,500 customers in the 62828 postal (ZIP) code. Dahlgren has had no locally published newspaper since the cessation of publication of The Dahlgren Echo many years ago. There is no current newspaper of record as the weekly  McLeansboro Times-Leader formerly published in the county seat folded in 2018. Other daily newspapers available for home delivery in the area include The Morning Sentinel (Centralia & Mt. Vernon) and The Southern Illinoisan (regional print newspaper).

Dahlgren is in the Harrisburg, IL / Cape Girardeau, MO / Paducah, KY television Designated Market Area (DMA), the 90th largest television market in 2019 as defined by Nielsen Media Research. Residents receive over-the-air reception of the following digital broadcast channels from networks and other affiliates:
 ABC (WSIL) —  3.1 HD, 3.2 SD Heroes and Icons, 3.3 SD Justice Network, 3.4 SD Court TV & 3.5 SD Ion — RF channel 34
 NBC (WPSD) —  6.1 HD, 6.2 SD Cozi & 6.3 SD Antenna TV — RF channel 32 (planned to be repacked to RF channel 19)
 PBS (WSIU) —  8.1 HD, 8.2 SD PBS World, 8.3 SD Create, 8.4 FM Simulcast and Public Info, & 8.5 SD PBS Kids — RF channel 8
 CBS (KFVS) — 12.1 HD, 12.2 HD CW (WQTV-TV) & 12.3 SD Grit — RF channel 12 (planned to be repacked to RF channel 11)
 3ABN (W15BU-D) — 15.1 SD English, 15.2 SD Spanish, 15.3 3ABN Radio, & 15.4 Radio 74 — RF channel 15
 PBS (WUSI) — 16.1 HD, 16.2 PBS World, 16.3 Create & 16.4 FM Simulcast & Public Info — RF channel 19 (planned to be repacked to RF channel 23)
 Fox (KBSI) — 23.1 HD, 23.2 My Network TV 49 (WDKA), & 23.3 SD Comet — RF channel 22 (planned to be repacked to RF channel 36)
 TCT (WTCT) — 27.1 SD, 27.2 HD & 27.3 SD Light TV — RF channel 17 (planned to be repacked to RF channel 30)
 MyNetworkTV (WDKA) — 49.1 HD, 49.2 SD Charge!, 49.3 SD TBD, & 49.4 Stadium — RF channel 49 (planned to be repacked to RF channel 25)

Since the digital television transition of 2009 there have been many ownership and affiliation changes in television markets. The Harrisburg, IL / Cape Girardeau, MO / Paducah, KY DMA has been no exception. In 2019 major players include Sinclair, Paxton Media Group, Raycom Media, Quincy Media, and the University of Southern Illinois. WPXS (Daystar), licensed to Mt. Vernon, moved its transmitter northwest of Breese, IL in the St. Louis, MO DMA and is no longer available over-the-air in Dahlgren. Viewers with a rotator and suitably elevated antenna can also receive virtually all over-the-air broadcasts from Evansville, Indiana.

Cable television service (analog), previously available from Longview Communication, was terminated in 2006. Hamilton County Communications (a wholly controlled subsidiary of the Hamilton County Telephone Cooperative - HCTC) acquired the cable-operating rights upon Longview's demise and operated an IPTV-based television service under the Futiva brand until 2019 when HCC exited the business.

Mobile telephony services are provided by ATT (formerly Cingular) and Verizon. At one time 6 providers offered cellphone coverage, either directly or through roaming agreements. This included First Cellular of Southern Illinois (which HCTC co-owned) and T-Mobile.

Local landline telephone and DSL service is available through the Hamilton County Telephone Cooperative (and/or Hamilton County Communications). Wireless broadband service is provided by all mobile providers. Satellite broadband service is available from Exede/ViaSat and HughesNet.

Government and schools 

Dahlgren is governed by a non-partisan village president (mayor) and six-member non-partisan Board of Trustees, half of whom are elected to staggered four-year terms in odd-numbered years. Steve Wilkerson was re-elected village president in 2017. The village provides basic utility services including water, sewer, and gas and contracts on a fee-for-service basis with a third party for refuse removal.

Dahlgren is located within the Hamilton County Unit 10 school district. Elementary-age children attend Dahlgren Grade School through sixth grade. Junior high school and high school students travel to the county seat of McLeansboro, where a new combined school complex was completed in 2001. Dahlgren is also in Community College District #521 (Rend Lake College, located Ina, Illinois) as established by the Illinois Board of Higher Education. However, university and college-age students are not restricted to attending in their local district.

References

External links
History of Dahlgren
McLeansboro Times-Leader

Villages in Hamilton County, Illinois
Villages in Illinois
Mount Vernon, Illinois micropolitan area
Populated places established in 1872
1872 establishments in Illinois